Homeland is a 2000 album by South African singer Miriam Makeba.  It was released in 2000 on CD by world music label Putumayo.  It includes a duet starring Makeba and Zenzi Lee in a renovated version of Makeba's trademark hit song "Pata Pata" (1967), entitled "Pata Pata 2000".  Congolese pop star Lokua Kanza also contributed to this album both as a songwriter (for "Homeland" and "Lindelani") and as a singer ("Lindelani").

Both the title-track and the whole record are largely conceived as a celebration of the end of apartheid.  The record was released a few days before the South African Freedom Day on 27 April 2000.  The album was nominated for a Grammy Award in the Best World Music Album category.

Track listing 
 "Masakhane" – 4:42
 "Amaliya" – 3:12
 "Pata Pata 2000" – 3:49
 "'Cause We Live for Love" – 4:35
 "Liwa Wechi" – 3:30
 "Lindelani" – 3:14
 "Homeland" – 4:06
 "Umhome" – 5:09
 "Africa Is Where My Heart Lies" – 4:39
 "In Time" – 5:01

References 

1991 albums
Miriam Makeba albums